The Belgium women's national under-18 and under-19 basketball team is a national basketball team of Belgium, administered by the Belgian Basketball Federation.
It represents the country in international under-18 and under-19 (under age 18 and under age 19) basketball competitions.

Competitive record

See also
Belgium women's national basketball team
Belgium women's national under-17 basketball team
Belgium men's national under-19 basketball team

References

External links
Archived records of Belgium team participations

Women's national under-19 basketball teams
Basketball